The Green River is the largest tributary of the North Fork Toutle River in the U.S. state of Washington.

As with most other parts of the Toutle River and Cowlitz River systems, the upper part of the Green River was heavily affected by the 1980 eruption of Mount St. Helens.

Course
It rises from snowmelt on the opposite side of a ridge from Spirit Lake, in the Gifford Pinchot National Forest in Skamania County. The river initially flows north, but turns northwest after the confluence with Grizzly Creek. Turning west, it crosses into Lewis County, then back south into Skamania, and almost immediately afterwards flows into Cowlitz County. Shultz Creek enters from the left then Devils Creek from the right. The river empties into the North Fork Toutle River near the unincorporated community of Toutle.

References

Rivers of Washington (state)
Rivers of Lewis County, Washington
Rivers of Skamania County, Washington
Rivers of Cowlitz County, Washington
Gifford Pinchot National Forest